Anam station, also known as Korea University Hospital station, is a subway station on the Line 6 of the Seoul Metropolitan Subway. The station is located between the Korea University Anam Campus and the Korea University Anam Hospital.

Station layout

Vicinity
Exit 1 : Korea University Anam Hospital & Life Sciences Campus, Sungshin Women's University
Exit 2 : Korea University Humanities & Social Sciences Campus
Exit 3 : Anam ogeori (5-way intersection), Jongam Elementary School
Exit 4 : Korea University Natural Sciences & Engineering Campus

References 

Railway stations opened in 2000
Seoul Metropolitan Subway stations
Metro stations in Seongbuk District